Allaedine Berrached (born 31 January 1994) is a Qatari handball player for Al-Duhail and the Qatari national team.

He represented Qatar at the 2019 World Men's Handball Championship.

References

1994 births
Living people
Qatari male handball players
Handball players at the 2018 Asian Games
Asian Games medalists in handball
Asian Games gold medalists for Qatar
Medalists at the 2018 Asian Games